3C 249.1 is a Seyfert galaxy located in the constellation Draco.

References

External links
 www.jb.man.ac.uk/atlas/
 Simbad

Seyfert galaxies
Draco (constellation)
249.1
+77.09
2821945